La Tina Ranch is a census-designated place (CDP) in Cameron County, in the U.S. state of Texas. The population was 618 at the 2010 census. Prior to the 2010 census the community was part of the Arroyo Gardens-La Tina Ranch CDP. It is part of the Brownsville–Harlingen Metropolitan Statistical Area.

Geography
It is bordered on the west by Arroyo Gardens.

References

Census-designated places in Cameron County, Texas
Census-designated places in Texas